Richard Nickl (born 13 June 1980) is an Austrian mathematician and Professor of Mathematical Statistics  at the University of Cambridge. 

He grew up in Vienna, attended secondary school at the Theresianum there (graduating in 1998 with distinction) and obtained his academic degrees from the University of Vienna, including a PhD in 2005. He has made contributions to various areas of mathematical statistics; including non-parametric and high-dimensional statistics, empirical process theory, and Bayesian inference for statistical inverse problems and partial differential equations. Jointly with Evarist Giné, he is the author of the book `Mathematical foundations of infinite-dimensional statistical models', published with Cambridge University Press, which won the 2017 PROSE Award for best  monograph in the mathematics category.

Selected publication
Evarist Giné & Richard Nickl, Mathematical foundations of infinite-dimensional statistical models, Cambridge University Press (2016)

References

Austrian mathematicians
1980 births
Living people
Cambridge mathematicians
Fellows of Queens' College, Cambridge
University of Vienna alumni
Mathematical statisticians